The Yining–Dunmazha Expressway, commonly referred to as the S12 Yidun Expressway is an expressway that connects the town of Bayandai in Yining City with Dunmazha in Yining County. The route is entirely in the Ili Kazakh Autonomous Prefecture in the Chinese autonomous region of Xinjiang. The expressway is a part of China National Highway 218. It opened on December 16, 2013, replacing an old alignment of the highway. At its western end in Bayandai, it connects to the G3016 Qingshuihe–Yining Expressway.

Tolls began to be collected on the entire route of the expressway on June 15, 2015.

References

Expressways in Xinjiang